Johann Weidel (born 1904, date of death unknown) was a Swiss boxer. He competed in the men's bantamweight event at the 1924 Summer Olympics.

References

External links
 

1904 births
Year of death missing
Swiss male boxers
Olympic boxers of Switzerland
Boxers at the 1924 Summer Olympics
Place of birth missing
Bantamweight boxers